Three ships of the Royal Navy have borne the name HMS Veteran:

  was a 64-gun third-rate ship of the line, launched in 1787 and broken up in 1816.
She was used for harbour service from 1819, was renamed HMS Veteran in 1839 and was broken up in 1852.
  was an Admiralty V and W-class destroyer launched in 1919 and sunk in 1942.

Royal Navy ship names